Pell Trenton (born William T. Baker; August 29, 1883 – March 3, 1924) was an actor in theater and Hollywood films during the silent film era. He was popular and had leading roles.

Background
Pell Trenton was born August 29, 1883, in New York City. He was in theater from 1910 and began in juvenile roles in film. In 1917 he was in Hamilton. A headshot of Trenton is signed by him and Chamberlain Brown "manager".

His career was cut short when he fell ill in 1921 and died on March 3, 1924, in Los Angeles from a pulmonary tuberculosis at the age of 40.

Filmography

The Adventurer (1917 Alice Guy film)  (1917)
 Stranded in Arcady (1917)
House of Glass (1918)
The Uplifters (1919)
The Rebellious Bride (1919)
The False Code (1919)The Joyous Liar (1919)Fair and Warmer (1919)The Willow Tree (1920)Beautifully Trimmed (1920)The House of Toys (1920)The Blue Moon (1920)
 The Greater Profit (1921)The New Disciple'' (1922)

References

External links

1883 births
1924 deaths
American male silent film actors
American male stage actors
20th-century American male actors
Male actors from New York City